The Way You Love Me may refer to:

 The Way You Love Me (Nathan Carter album), 2010
 "The Way You Love Me" (Faith Hill song), 2000
 "The Way You Love Me" (Karyn White song), 1988
 "The Way You Love Me" (Shanice song), 1988
 "The Way You Love Me" (Keri Hilson song), 2010
 "The Way You Love Me", a song by Jeremy Camp from Reckless, 2013
 "(I Like) The Way You Love Me", a song by Michael Jackson from The Ultimate Collection

See also 
 "I Love the Way You Love Me", a song by John Michael Montgomery
 "Like the Way You Love Me", a song by Sara Evans from the album ''Words, 2017